Matchless Mountain is a mountain which rises to  on the south margin of Fry Glacier, at the juncture of Atka Glacier, in the Convoy Range, Victoria Land, Antarctica. The name was suggested by New Zealand geologist Christopher J. Burgess, the leader of a 1976–77 Victoria University of Wellington Antarctic Expedition geological party to this locality, and refers to the matchless view of the surrounding area obtained from the summit of this mountain.

References

Mountains of Victoria Land
Scott Coast